Miasto mania is the debut studio album by Polish singer Maria Peszek, released in 2005 by Kayax. Thematically, it was a homage to Poland's capital, Warsaw, and served as a musical background to a multi-media theatre play of the same title which premiered simultaneously. All songs were co-written by Peszek and composed by Wojciech Waglewski and Emade who also produced the album. Miasto mania spawned the popular lead single "Moje miasto" and was a critical and commercial success, eventually earning platinum certification for selling in over 40,000 copies in Poland.

Track listing 
 "Moje miasto" – 4:43 ("My City")
 "Ćmy" – 2:54 ("Moths")
 "Mam kota" – 2:53 ("I Have a Cat")
 "SMS" – 4:59 
 "Ballada nie lada" – 2:54 ("What a Ballad")
 "Pieprzę cię miasto" – 4:07 ("Screw You, City")
 "Czarny worek" – 3:34 ("Black Sack")
 "Lali lali" – 5:30 
 "Mgła" – 3:31 ("Fog")
 "Nie mam czasu na seks" – 4:06 ("I Don't Have Time for Sex")
 "Miły mój" – 3:16 ("My Beloved")

Singles 
 2005: "Moje miasto"
 2006: "Nie mam czasu na seks"
 2006: "Miły mój"

Commercial performance

References

External links 
 Official audio stream on YouTube
 The official Maria Peszek website

2005 debut albums
Concept albums
Maria Peszek albums
Polish-language albums